The 2011 GP Car and Home World Cup of Curling was held from November 2 to 6 at the Essar Centre in Sault Ste. Marie, Ontario. It was the first Grand Slam event of the 2011–12 curling season and the eleventh time the tournament has been held. The purse for the event was CAD$100,000. Glenn Howard won his fifth World Cup of Curling and his ninth Grand Slam title overall after he and his team defeated John Epping in the final with a score of 6–4.

Teams

Round robin standings
Final Round Robin Standings

Round robin results

Draw 1
Wednesday, November 2, 7:30 pm

Draw 2
Thursday, November 3, 9:00 am

Draw 3
Thursday, November 3, 12:30 pm

Draw 4
Thursday, November 3, 4:00 pm

Draw 5
Thursday, November 3, 7:30 pm

Draw 6
Friday, November 4, 9:00 am

Draw 7
Friday, November 4, 12:30 pm

Draw 8
Friday, November 4, 4:00 pm

Draw 9
Friday, November 4, 7:30 pm

Tiebreakers
Saturday, November 5, 8:30 am

Playoffs

Quarterfinals
Saturday, November 5, 12:00 pm

Semifinals
Saturday, November 5, 7:00 pm

Final
Sunday, November 6, 1:00 pm

External links
Event Home Page

World Cup
World Cup of Curling
Sport in Sault Ste. Marie, Ontario
Curling in Northern Ontario
Masters (curling)
World Cup of Curling